Cameron Toshiro Iwasa (born July 7, 1993) is an American former professional soccer player.

Career

College and amateur
Iwasa spent his entire college career at UC Irvine.  He made a total of 85 appearances for the anteaters and tallied 22 goals and 14 assists.

He also played in the Premier Development League for OC Pateadores Blues.

Professional
On January 20, 2015, Iwasa was selected in the fourth round (65th overall) of the 2015 MLS SuperDraft by the Montreal Impact.  However, he was cut during training camp and offered a contract with Montreal's USL affiliate, which he declined.  Two months later, he signed a professional contract with his hometown club Sacramento Republic FC.  He made his professional debut the following day in a 4–2 defeat to Seattle Sounders FC 2.

Iwasa signed with Major League Soccer side Sporting Kansas City on January 10, 2017.

Iwasa returned to Sacramento Republic FC for the 2018 season on December 22, 2017.

During the final game of the season, Iwasa scored his 60th USL goal, securing a tie in the match.  Following the 2021 season, Iwasa announced his retirement from playing professional soccer.

Personal life
Iwasa was raised in Sacramento’s College Greens neighborhood. His grandfather is of Japanese descent.

References

External links
UC Irvine Anteaters bio

1993 births
Living people
American soccer players
American sportspeople of Japanese descent
Association football forwards
CF Montréal draft picks
OC Pateadores Blues players
Sacramento Republic FC players
Soccer players from Sacramento, California
Sporting Kansas City players
Sporting Kansas City II players
UC Irvine Anteaters men's soccer players
USL Championship players
USL League Two players